An image is a visual representation of something. It can be two-dimensional, three-dimensional, or somehow otherwise feed into the visual system to convey information. An image can be an artifact, such as a photograph or other two-dimensional picture, that resembles a subject. In the context of signal processing, an image is a distributed amplitude of color(s).

In optics, the term "image" may refer specifically to a 2D image.

An image does not have to use the entire visual system to be a visual representation. A popular example of this is of a greyscale image, which uses the visual system's sensitivity to brightness across all wavelengths, without taking into account different colors. A black and white visual representation of something is still an image, even though it does not make full use of the visual system's capabilities.

Images are typically still, but in some cases can be moving or animated.

Characteristics
Images may be two or three-dimensional, such as a photograph or screen display, or three-dimensional, such as a statue or hologram. They may be captured by optical devices – such as cameras, mirrors, lenses, telescopes, microscopes, and natural objects and phenomena, such as the human eye or water.

The word 'image' is also used in the broader sense of any two-dimensional figure such as a map, graph, pie chart, painting or banner. In this wider sense, images can also be rendered manually, such as by drawing, the art of painting, carving, rendered automatically by printing or computer graphics technology, or developed by a combination of methods.

A volatile image is one that exists only for a short period of time. This may be a reflection of an object by a mirror, a projection of a camera obscura, or a scene displayed on a cathode-ray tube.  A fixed image, also called a hard copy, is one that has been recorded on a material object, such as paper or textile by photography or any other digital process.

A mental image exists in an individual's mind, as something one remembers or imagines.  The subject of an image need not be real; it may be an abstract concept, such as a graph, function, or imaginary entity. Different scholars of psychoanalysis as well as the social sciences such as Slavoj Žižek and Jan Berger have pointed out the possibility of manipulating mental images for ideological purposes.

In culture
Images perpetuated in public education, media, and popular culture have a profound impact on the formation of such mental images:The development of synthetic acoustic technologies and the creation of sound art have led to a consideration of the possibilities of a sound-image made up of irreducible phonic substance beyond linguistic or musicological analysis.

Still or moving

A  is a single static image. This phrase is used in photography, visual media and the computer industry to emphasize that one is not talking about movies, or in very precise or pedantic technical writing such as a standard.

A  is typically a movie (film) or video, including digital video. It could also be an animated display such as a zoetrope.

A still frame is a still image derived from one frame of a moving one. In contrast, a film still is a photograph taken on the set of a movie or television program during production, used for promotional purposes.

Two-dimensional (2D)
A two-dimensional (2D) image is a visual representation of something that is represented using only two spatial dimensions. Many 2D images are in the shape of rectangles. A common process by which 2D images have historically been displayed is called rasterization. , 2D images are the most common types of image.

In image processing, a picture function is a mathematical representation of a two-dimensional image as a function of two spatial variables. The function f(x,y) describes the intensity of the point at coordinates (x,y).

Three-dimensional (3D)
Three-dimensional (3D) images are less common than two-dimensional images. Three-dimensional images feed into the visual system's perception of depth to more accurately portray visual information. Common physical forms of 3D images include holograms.

Literature 

In literature, imagery is a "mental picture" which appeals to the senses. It can both be figurative and literal.

See also
 Cinematography
 Computer-generated imagery
 Digital image
 Fine-art photography
 Graphics
 Image editing
 Imaging
 Mental image
 Photograph
 Pictorial script
 Satellite image
 Drawing
 Painting
 Visual arts

References

Photography
Digital photography
Computer graphics
Graphic design
Vision